Bloodstrike (Eric Conroy) is a fictional supervillain appearing in American comic books published by Marvel Comics.

Fictional character biography
Eric Conroy's father, Lt. Mark Conroy, served in the Vietnam war. Lt. Conroy's unit, calling themselves the Half-Fulls, discovered an ancient temple deep in the jungles of Cambodia a

and met a mystic named Tai, who convinced most of them to marry the six daughters of the Dragon's Breadth cult. The soldiers returned home with their new brides, and Mark and his wife had Eric soon after.

Eric was once the enforcer for a mobster in Chicago, until the Left Hand killed his boss and recruited him to join the Folding Circle. The Left Hand is Diego Casseas, one of the members of Conroy's unit, who had stolen the mystical power inherent in his own child. Eric Conroy is now recruiting the Dragon's Breadth children in order to take control of the Well of All Things. This ancient fountain of power exists deep inside the Cambodian temple. In one of his first missions, Eric Conroy kills a security guard. This action transforms Eric Conroy's body; unbreakable pink material wraps around his arms, legs, and waist.

The Folding Circle arrives at the temple, along with the New Warriors, and discovers that Tai wants to sacrifice everyone but herself so she can gain the Well's powers. The teams work together to save their own lives, and Tai is seemingly slain by Night Thrasher. The Folding Circle escapes, stealing the New Warriors' quinjet. The Folding Circle crashes in Madripoor and tries to become a player in the Madripoor underworld, taking over a drug organization. Later, Night Thrasher and Silhouette defeat the entire Circle.

Powers and abilities
The character Bloodstrike is a mutate whose powers come from the Universal Wellspring.

Notes

References

Comics characters introduced in 1992
Characters created by Fabian Nicieza
Fictional characters from Chicago
Marvel Comics characters with superhuman strength
Marvel Comics male supervillains
Marvel Comics mutates